Hlushchenko, Glushchenko or Gluschenko is a gender-neutral Ukrainian surname that may refer to

Andriy Hlushchenko (born 1974), Ukrainian footballer
Dmytro Hlushchenko (born 1981), Ukrainian sprinter
Fedor Glushchenko (born 1944), Russian conductor and violinist
Mykola Hlushchenko (1901–1977), Ukrainian artist
Tetyana Hlushchenko (born 1956), Ukrainian handball player
Vitali Glushchenko (born 1985), Russian footballer

See also
 
 

Ukrainian-language surnames